is a railway station in the town of Yamamoto, Miyagi Prefecture, Japan, operated by East Japan Railway Company (JR East). The original station was severely damaged by the 2011 Tōhoku earthquake and tsunami in March 2011, and was relocated to a new location in December 2016.

Lines

Station layout
The station had a single island platform and a side platform connected to the station building by a footbridge. The station had a "Midori no Madoguchi" staffed ticket office.

History
Yamashita Station opened on May 10, 1949. The station was absorbed into the JR East network upon the privatization of the Japanese National Railways (JNR) on April 1, 1987.

Services on the Jōban Line between Hamayoshida Station and Soma Station were suspended due to damage caused by the 2011 Tōhoku earthquake and tsunami on 11 March 2011. The station reopened at a new location approximately 1 kilometer further inland on 10 December 10, 2016.。

Passenger statistics
In fiscal 2018, the station was used by an average of 598 passengers daily (boarding passengers only).

Surrounding area
Yamamoto town hall

See also
 List of railway stations in Japan

References

External links

  

Stations of East Japan Railway Company
Railway stations in Miyagi Prefecture
Jōban Line
Railway stations in Japan opened in 1949
Yamamoto, Miyagi